Charles Francis Thaon (3 September 1910 – 12 February 2000) was a French speed skater. He competed in the 500 m, 1500 m and 5000 m events at the 1928 Winter Olympics and placed 26th–30th. After the Olympics  he served as Secretary General of the French Federation of Ice Sports.

References

External links
 

1910 births
2000 deaths
French male speed skaters
Olympic speed skaters of France
Speed skaters at the 1928 Winter Olympics